Olivia Mary Fergusson (born 27 March 1995) is an English professional footballer who plays as a forward for Celtic in the Scottish Women's Premier League.

Club career

Aston Villa 
Fergusson started her career at Aston Villa after graduating from the club's centre of excellence. Fergusson went on to score 8 goals in the 2015 for the club. She left following the expiration of her contract at the end of the 2015 season.

Bristol City 
On 4 February 2016, it was announced that Ferguson had joined Bristol City. Fergusson made 6 appearances in her first season for Bristol. The following season, Fergusson made 12 league appearances did not score for her new club in a season where Bristol came 8th in the FA Women's Super League.

Yeovil Town 
On 18 August 2018, it was announced that Fergusson ahad joined Yeovil Town. In the 2018–19 season, Fergusson played 20 games as well as scoring her only league goal for the club in a 2–1 defeat away to Manchester City on 28 April 2019.

Sheffield United 
Following Yeovil's relegation to the third-tier, Fergusson joined Sheffield United on 11 July 2019. She scored 7 goals in the Championship as Sheffield United finished 2nd. She left at the conclusion of the 2019–20 season.

Celtic FC 
After departing Sheffield, Olivia Fergusson joined Leicester City.

International career 
Fergusson has represented at U17 level for her country playing 6 times and scoring 1 goal. These games came in the qualifying for the 2012 UEFA European Under-17 Championship but England failed to get passed the elite round of qualifying.

Fergusson represented England at U23 level during a double header friendlies vs Norway and during the 2018 Nordic Cup in Sweden.

Career statistics

Club

References 

Living people
1995 births
Yeovil Town L.F.C. players
English women's footballers
Aston Villa W.F.C. players
Bristol City W.F.C. players
Sheffield United W.F.C. players
Leicester City W.F.C. players
Women's association football forwards
Coventry United W.F.C. players
People from Burntwood
Women's Championship (England) players